Cacotherapia demeridalis is a species of snout moth in the genus Cacotherapia. It was described by Schaus in 1924, and is known from Guatemala.

References

Cacotherapiini
Moths described in 1924